Herakles Farms, formerly known as SG Sustainable Oils, is an American company active in oil palm plantations and timber business. Its headquarters are in New York City. According to its web site, it is committed to sustainability.

Activity in Cameroon
The presence of Herakles Farms in Cameroon started in 2009. Sithe Global Sustainable Oils Cameroon (SGSOC) is a Cameroonian subsidiary of Herakles Farms, has received a concession of 73,000 hectares of rainforest to be replaced by oil palm plantations in 2009. This was suspended by the government of Cameroon in May 2013. Herakles Farms claims to invest 300 billion francs CFA and improve the life of indigenous persons of the area. Far more locals are opposed to than in favor of this project. SCSOC has frequently used intimidation and corruption, especially against leaders and key decision makers in the community. A court in Limbe, Cameroon has condemned Herakles to a fine of 4.6 million for racist discrimination. The rainforest mentioned is habitat of the Nigeria-Cameroon chimpanzee and the drill.

References

External links
Website of Herakles Farms

Agriculture companies of the United States
Palm oil companies
Companies based in New York City
Companies with year of establishment missing